Martin O'Brien may refer to:

 Martin O'Brien (artist), British performance artist
 Martin O'Brien (journalist), Irish journalist
 Martin O'Brien (footballer) (1875–1946), Australian rules footballer
 Martin O'Brien (humanitarian) (born 1964), human rights activist and charity administrator in Northern Ireland
 Martin O'Brien (hurler) (1885–1958), Irish hurler